FC Litija was a futsal club from Litija, Slovenia. Founded in 1982, it has won the Slovenian Futsal League a record ten times.

Honours
Slovenian Championship
 Winners (10): 1996–97, 1998–99, 2000–01, 2001–02, 2002–03, 2003–04, 2004–05, 2010–11, 2011–12, 2012–13

Slovenian Cup
 Winners (9): 1995–96, 1998–99, 1999–2000, 2001–02, 2002–03, 2009–10, 2010–11, 2011–12, 2013–14

Slovenian Supercup
 Winners (10): 2000, 2004, 2005, 2010, 2012, 2013, 2016, 2017, 2020, 2021

References

External links
Official website 

Futsal clubs established in 1982
Sports clubs disestablished in 2022
Futsal clubs in Slovenia
1982 establishments in Yugoslavia
2022 disestablishments in Slovenia